Nupsskarvet Mountain is a broad mountain at the north side of Halisrimen Peak in the Kurze Mountains of Queen Maud Land. Mapped from surveys and air photos by Norwegian Antarctic Expedition (1956–60) and named Nupsskarvet.

See also
Lokehellene Cliffs, steep rock cliffs which form the west side of Nupsskarvet Mountain
Nupsskåka Valley, an ice-filled valley at the southwest side of Nupsskarvet Mountain

References

External links

Mountains of Queen Maud Land
Princess Astrid Coast